Hossam Hussein Bakr Abdin (born October 26, 1985) is an Egyptian boxer who won a welterweight bronze at the 2007 All-Africa Games and later qualified for the 2008 Summer Olympics.

Career
At the Arab Championships he lost to Tunisian Rached Merdassi but won the PanArab Games later that year. At the All-Africa Games he was knocked out in the semifinal by Ghanaian Bastir Samir and won bronze. He also participated at the 2007 World Championships. At the Olympic qualifier he defeated Choaib Oussaci of Algeria 16–6. In his first Olympic match he defeated Non Boonjumnong of Thailand 11–10, in the quarter final he lost to Cuban Carlos Banteux.

External links
 PanArabGames 2007
 All African
 Qualifier

Living people
1985 births
Welterweight boxers
Olympic boxers of Egypt
Boxers at the 2008 Summer Olympics
Boxers at the 2016 Summer Olympics
Egyptian male boxers
AIBA World Boxing Championships medalists
African Games bronze medalists for Egypt
African Games medalists in boxing
Mediterranean Games silver medalists for Egypt
Mediterranean Games medalists in boxing
Competitors at the 2007 All-Africa Games
Competitors at the 2013 Mediterranean Games
21st-century Egyptian people